The Cottage, Charlton, Northamptonshire, England is a house of 18th century origins. In 1907 it was bought by F. E. Smith, 1st Earl of Birkenhead as his country home. Smith subsequently purchased another cottage on Main Street in Charlton and engaged Alan James to extend the house in 1911–12. James constructed a large central block to join the two cottages, and remodelled the grounds. Smith entertained at The Cottage throughout his legal and political careers, among his most frequent guests was Winston Churchill, his closest friend. Smith, ennobled as Viscount Furneaux, of Charlton in the County of Northampton, and Earl of Birkenhead in 1922, died of pneumonia caused by cirrhosis of the liver in 1930, aged 58. After cremation at Golders Green Crematorium, his ashes were brought to Charlton and interred in a tomb designed by Edwin Lutyens in the cemetery on Green Lane, just outside of the village. The Cottage remains a private residence and is a Grade II listed building.

History
Frederick Edwin Smith was born in Birkenhead on the Wirral Peninsula in 1872. His grandfather had established a successful estate agency, Smith & Sons, and his father had entered local politics as a Liberal councillor. Smith's ambitions lay in the areas of national politics and Toryism. After reading law at Oxford, he became one of the most eminent, and wealthiest, barristers of his day. In 1906 he entered Parliament, with "the most famous maiden speech ever made in the House of Commons".
{{quote box|width=25em|bgcolor=#c6dbf7|align=left|quote=
FREDERICK EDWIN SMITH P.C., G.C.S.I, D.C.L., LL.D.FIRST EARL OF BIRKENHEADSOMETIMELORD HIGH CHANCELLORSECRETARY OF STATE FOR INDIAATTORNEY GENERAL SOLICITOR GENERALHIGH STEWARD OF OXFORD UNIVERSITYFOUR TIMES TREASURER OF GRAYS INNHIS BY SOVEREIGNTY OF NATURE|source=–Birkenhead's "characteristically proud" inscription on his tomb at Charlton}}
The following year Smith bought a cottage on Main Street in Charlton, a small village in the south-west of the county of Northamptonshire, some 18 miles north of Oxford. The origins of what became The Cottage were two farmhouses of 18th century date, built in a vernacular style. After purchasing the first in 1907, Smith bought the second before 1911 and employed Alan James to construct a large central block linking the two. This block contained a "grand library".  The house was greatly enlarged in 1911–1912, and continuously developed for the remainder of Smith's life; a swimming pool, tennis courts and stables were added "with the proceeds of every big brief that came his way". Smith's political career saw him become Lord Chancellor in 1919 and Secretary of State for India in 1924. Weekends and summer holidays were spent at Charlton, with guests including his closest friend, Winston Churchill, the Duke of York, Cecil Beaton and Alfred Munnings. Smith's alcoholism had been long been among his most notable characteristics and he died, aged 58 in 1930, of pneumonia brought about by cirrhosis. His ashes were interred in a tomb designed by Edwin Lutyens in a small cemetery on Green Lane to the north-west of the village.

Smith was succeeded in his titles, and at Charlton, by his son, and subsequently his grandson. Lady Juliet Townsend, Birkenhead's granddaughter, was brought up at the house. The Cottage remains a private residence and was restored in the early 21st century.

Architecture and description
The Cottage is of built of limestone and ironstone rubble, with ironstone dressings. The building is of eleven bays, three in the central block, and three in the wing to the left and five in that to the right. The central block has an elaborate doorcase with Tuscan columns, and a bronze plaque, and a cherub in a niche, above. Also on the entrance front are stone panels inscribed with the initials F.E.S and M.E.S'', denoting Smith and his wife, Margaret. The garden frontage is more asymmetrical, with gables and a veranda. The Cottage is a Grade II listed building.

Footnotes

References

Sources
 
 
 
 

Grade II listed houses
Grade II listed buildings in Northamptonshire
Country houses in Northamptonshire